Turnover number has two different meanings:

In enzymology, turnover number (also termed kcat) is defined as the maximum number of chemical conversions of substrate molecules per second that a single active site will execute for a given enzyme concentration  for enzymes with two or more active sites. For enzymes with a single active site, kcat is referred to as the catalytic constant. It can be calculated from the maximum reaction rate  and catalyst site concentration  as follows:

 (See Michaelis–Menten kinetics).

In other chemical fields, such as organometallic catalysis, turnover number (abbreviated TON) has a different meaning: the number of moles of substrate that a mole of catalyst can convert before becoming inactivated. An ideal catalyst would have an infinite turnover number in this sense, because it would never be consumed. The term turnover frequency (abbreviated TOF) is used to refer to the turnover per unit time, equivalent to the meaning of turnover number in enzymology.  For most relevant industrial applications, the turnover frequency is in the range of 10−2 – 102 s−1 (103 – 107 s−1 for enzymes). The enzyme catalase has the largest turnover frequency, with values up to 4 × 107 s−1 having been reported.

Turnover number of diffusion-limited enzymes

AChE is a serine hydrolase with a reported catalytic constant > 10,000/s. This implies that AChE reacts with acetylcholine at close to the diffusion-limited rate.

Carbonic anhydrase is one of the fastest enzymes, and its rate is typically limited by the diffusion rate of its substrates. Typical catalytic constants for the different forms of this enzyme range between 104 and 106 reactions per second.

See also

 Catalysis

References

Enzyme kinetics
Units of catalytic activity